Rorketon is a small unincorporated community in the Rural Municipality of Lakeshore, located between Lake Dauphin and Lake Manitoba. The main industry in this area is cattle ranching. According to the 2006 census, the population of the Lawrence Municipality, of which it had been part, was 501. 

Rorketon is situated on PTH 364 approximately 40 kilometres north of Ste. Rose du Lac, Manitoba. It is also situated about 20 kilometres from Manipogo Provincial Park.

References

Unincorporated communities in Parkland Region, Manitoba